The UC Santa Barbara Gauchos men's soccer team is an NCAA Division I college soccer team composed of student-athletes attending the University of California, Santa Barbara. The Gauchos play their home matches at Harder Stadium. Like most of the other UC Santa Barbara Gauchos athletic teams, the men's soccer team competes in the Big West Conference.

The UCSB Gauchos won the 2006 NCAA Division I Men's Soccer Championship. The program has produced a total of 19 All-American selections, all but one of which since 2002, and over 60 players who have gone on to play professionally or represent their senior national teams.

Eash season from 2007 to 2015, the Gauchos were recognized by the NCAA as the men's attendance champions by average attendance (men's and women's inclusive across Division I, II, and III) – the longest such recorded streak in the NCAA record books. The program holds the top six all-time NCAA soccer records for largest regular season attendances at on-campus venues (men's and women's inclusive across Division I, II, and III). This is highlighted by the top all-time mark of 15,896 fans packed into Harder Stadium on September 24, 2010, when UC Santa Barbara hosted UCLA for their regular season match, despite the Santa Barbara County Fire Marshal turning fans away at the gates for fear of filling the stadium over capacity.

History

Humble beginnings 
UC Santa Barbara fielded its first men's soccer team in 1966, but they didn't compete in the Big West Conference until 1983.  The Gauchos had mixed success, with good seasons (1983, 1988) alongside bad seasons (1991, 1992), but never found prolonged stretches of success or failure.

The Big West Conference stopped sponsoring men's soccer after the 1991 season, but re-instituted it prior to the 2001 season.  During this period, UCSB competed in the Mountain Pacific Sports Federation.  The return of soccer to the Big West Conference marked the rough beginning of the Gauchos' greatest success to date.

Vom Steeg era 
In January 1999, UC Santa Barbara's athletic director, Gary Cunningham, was successfully able to hire former UCSB and professional soccer player, Tim Vom Steeg, away from Santa Barbara City College to lead the Gauchos' program.  The Gauchos won the 2001 Big West Conference championship for the first time in their history, but missed out on a trip to the NCAA Tournament since the Big West Conference was ineligible for an automatic bid.  UC Santa Barbara have won eight Big West regular season championships (2001, 2002, 2004, 2006, 2007, 2009, 2013, 2014) and have won the Big West tournament in 2010.

2004 NCAA Championships 
The Gauchos burst on to the national scene in 2004 during their run at the 2004 NCAA Championship.  The showing in this tournament established UC Santa Barbara as a force in college soccer, with UCSB marching all the way to the finals before losing out on penalties to Indiana.

2006 NCAA Championships 

The crowning achievement of the men's soccer program took place in 2006, where UCSB won the NCAA Division I Championship in a 2–1 decision over UCLA.  It marked the program's first championship and only the university's second athletics championship (1979 Men's Water Polo).

At one point during the season, UCSB's record stood at 7–6 with dim prospects for postseason glory.  However, a 5–1 stretch to close out the regular season raised morale.  The Gauchos made the NCAA Tournament as an unseeded team.  During their championship run, the unseeded Gauchos defeated San Diego State at home, then #1 ranked/#3 seeded SMU followed by Old Dominion on the road, and finally Northwestern before an NCAA season high 8,784 people at Harder Stadium in Santa Barbara.  This propelled the Gauchos into the Final Four and earned them a trip to the College Cup held at Hermann Stadium in St. Louis, Missouri.

UCSB needed extra time to defeat #2 seed Wake Forest 0–0 (4–3 on penalties) in their first match of the College Cup.  The final was a matchup between Southern California teams as UCLA advanced on a 4–0 win over Virginia.  The #8 ranked/#8 seeded Bruins served as the final team to fall to the Gauchos by a score of 2–1 to complete UCSB's magical season.

Players

Current squad

Notable former players 
Players noted below, with years at UCSB in parentheses, have represented their senior national team or played professionally.

Coaching staff

Current technical staff

Head coaches

The Blue-Green Rivalry 

Chosen as the #1 "Greatest Rivalry In College Soccer" by CollegeSoccerNews.com, the main rival of the UC Santa Barbara Gauchos soccer team is the Cal Poly Mustangs men's soccer team.  The rivalry is a part of the larger Blue–Green Rivalry, which encompasses all sports from the two schools.  With both schools located on the Central Coast less than 100 miles apart, attendance has risen dramatically following the Gauchos' 2006 NCAA Division I Men's Soccer Championship.  The crowds of these games are record-setting and are among the highest regular season games in NCAA college soccer history.

Postseason 
The UC Santa Barbara Gauchos have an NCAA Division I Tournament record of 19–11 through twelve appearances.

References

External links 

 

 
1966 establishments in California
Association football clubs established in 1966